0M (zero M) or 0-M may refer to:

0m, an abbreviation for zero meridian, or Prime Meridian
0m, an abbreviation in measurement for zero metres
1E0m2, an abbreviation for square metre, an order of magnitude for expressing area
1E0m3, an abbreviation for cubic metre, an order of magnitude for expressing volume
0-m, an abbreviation for zero manifold
Several terms related to 0 (number)
Zero map, see constant function
Zero morphism, a kind of morphism in category theory
Zero matrix, a matrix with all entries being zero
 Agent Zero-M a range of secret agent toy weapons by Mattel Toys

See also
M0 (disambiguation)